Borysthenes is a geographical name from classical antiquity. The term usually refers to the Dnieper River and its eponymous river god, but also seems to have been an alternative name for Pontic Olbia, a town situated near the mouth of the same river on the Black Sea coast, or the earlier settlement on Berezan Island.

The Greek historian Herodotus describes both the river and the town in some detail in the fourth book of his Histories:

This is the name that Herodotus in his Histories chooses to talk about Olbia. Supposedly, it was originally the name of another settlement located on Berezan island which is located at the mouth of the Dnieper and in the vicinity of Olbia.

In Greek mythology, Borysthenes fathered a nymph daughter Borysthenis, and a son Thoas, who became a king of the Taurians.

The Borysthenes is mentioned numerous times in The History of the Decline and Fall of the Roman Empire by Edward Gibbon. It was used as a route to the Black Sea by, among others, the Goths.

References

Ancient Greek geography
Dnieper
Scythia
Potamoi
Personifications in Greek mythology